Kimberley railway station is the central railway station of the city of Kimberley, in the Northern Cape province of South Africa. Because Kimberley is the junction of the main Cape Town–Johannesburg main line with another line from Bloemfontein, it is served by several routes of the Shosholoza Meyl inter-city service. Kimberley railway station is also used by the luxury tourist-oriented Blue Train and the private train holiday company Rovos Rail.

References 

Kimberley, Northern Cape
Transport in the Northern Cape
Shosholoza Meyl stations